Miguel Ángel 'Mikel' Roteta Lopetegui (born 16 January 1970 in San Sebastián, Basque Country) is a Spanish retired footballer who played as a central defender.

Honours
Málaga
UEFA Intertoto Cup: 2002
Segunda División B: 1997–98

External links

1970 births
Living people
Spanish footballers
Footballers from San Sebastián
Association football defenders
La Liga players
Segunda División players
Segunda División B players
Real Sociedad B footballers
Real Sociedad footballers
FC Barcelona Atlètic players
Cartagena FC players
Real Jaén footballers
Málaga CF players
Real Murcia players
Xerez CD footballers
Real Unión footballers
Spain under-23 international footballers
Spanish football managers